Desormeaux is a French surname that may refer to
Antonin Jean Desormeaux, 19th century French inventor 
J. Keith Desormeaux (born c. 1967), American horse trainer
Kent Desormeaux (born 1970), American jockey, brother of Keith 
Mélissa Désormeaux-Poulin (born 1981), French Canadian actress
Michael Desormeaux (born 1985), American football defensive back 
Pierre Désormeaux (born 1952), Canadian handball player

See also
Dollard-des-Ormeaux, on-island suburb of Montreal in Canada
Childs v Desormeaux, a Supreme Court of Canada decision on the topic of social host liability

French-language surnames